Alby Bahr (30 September 1881 – 14 November 1962) was an Australian rules footballer who played for Norwood Football Club in the South Australian Football Association/League (SAFA/SAFL).  Considered one of Norwood's finest players of the early 1900s, Bahr was recognised beyond his club by being appointed state captain in 1908 for South Australia for the inaugural interstate carnival held in Melbourne.  Bahr has been recognised posthumously as a significant player, being named in the Back Pocket in Norwood's Team of the Century and being inducted into the Norwood and South Australian Halls of Fame.

References

External links 

Norwood Football Club players
Australian rules footballers from South Australia
1881 births
1962 deaths
People from South Australia
South Australian Football Hall of Fame inductees